Hydroxyeicosatetraenoic acid may refer to:

 5-Hydroxyeicosatetraenoic acid
 12-Hydroxyeicosatetraenoic acid (12-HETE)
 15-Hydroxyeicosatetraenoic acid
 20-Hydroxyeicosatetraenoic acid (20-HETE)
 19-Hydroxyeicosatetraenoic acid (see 20-Hydroxyeicosatetraenoic acid)